Joseph Rodman West (September 19, 1822 – October 31, 1898) was a United States senator from Louisiana, a Union general in the United States Army during and after the American Civil War and the chief executive of the District of Columbia. As a commander of militia, he gave the order to torture and murder Apache chief Mangas Coloradas, who had come to meet with him under a flag of truce to discuss terms of peace. He also allowed the decapitation and desecration of the body.

Biography
Born in New Orleans, he moved with his parents to Philadelphia in 1824 and was educated in private schools. He attended the University of Pennsylvania from 1836 to 1837 and moved to New Orleans in 1841; he was a captain attached to Maryland and District of Columbia Volunteers in the Mexican–American War, 1847–1848. He moved to California in 1849, where he engaged in newspaper work in San Francisco, and was proprietor of the San Francisco Price Current.

During the Civil War he entered the Union Army as lieutenant of the First Regiment, California Volunteer Infantry, in 1861; he was promoted to the rank of colonel and brigadier general. He spent much of his service in the New Mexico Territory as well as Arizona Territory.

In January 1863, Mangas Coloradas decided to personally meet with U.S. military leaders at Fort McLane, near present-day Hurley in southwestern New Mexico. Mangas arrived under a white flag of truce to meet with Brigadier General West. Armed soldiers took him into custody, and West is reported to have given an execution order to the sentries. That night Mangas was tortured with heated bayonets, then shot and killed as he was "trying to escape."

In April 1864, West was ordered to Arkansas to take command of the 2nd Division, VII Corps. He led it through the Red River Campaign. In the fall 1864, under Major General Frederick Steele, he was engaged against Confederate Major General Sterling Price. He next commanded the cavalry in the Department of the Gulf, from May 15 to June 12, 1865.

He commanded the 1st Division of Cavalry in the Military Division of the Southwest, composed of two small brigades (six regiments) of volunteer cavalry exempted from mustering out. Accompanied by cavalry commander Maj-Gen Wesley Merritt, he led the division from Shreveport, Louisiana, to San Antonio, Texas, in July 1865 for Reconstruction duty and as a counter to Imperial Mexican forces along the Rio Grande. West was mustered out of volunteer service as a brevetted major general in San Antonio on January 4, 1866.

Following the Civil War, West returned to New Orleans and was deputy United States marshal and auditor for customs from 1867 to 1871. West was elected as a Republican to the U.S. Senate and served from March 4, 1871, to March 3, 1877; he was not a candidate for reelection. While in the Senate he was chairman of the Committee on Railroads (Forty-fourth Congress). He was a member of the board of commissioners of the District of Columbia from 1882 to 1885, serving as president of the board – the equivalent of mayor – from 1882 to 1883. He retired from public life in 1885 and died in Washington, D.C., in 1898; interment was in Arlington National Cemetery.

West Education Campus in Washington, D.C., is currently named in his honor.  The school is currently (2021) undergoing modernization, which may include a name change.

See also

 List of American Civil War generals (Union)

References

  The California State Military Museum; Californians and the Military; Major General Joseph Rodman West, photo of Lieutenant Colonel Joseph R. West, circa 1861.
 Retrieved on 2008-02-10

External links
 Joseph Rodman West photo as Brigadier General
 West Education Campus

1822 births
1898 deaths
Politicians from New Orleans
Republican Party United States senators from Louisiana
Washington, D.C., Republicans
Mayors of Washington, D.C.
Members of the Board of Commissioners for the District of Columbia
United States Marshals
19th-century American politicians
University of Pennsylvania alumni
American military personnel of the Mexican–American War
Union Army generals
People of California in the American Civil War
Burials at Arlington National Cemetery